This page provides supplementary chemical data on chloroform.

Material Safety Data Sheet  

The handling of this chemical may incur notable safety precautions. It is highly recommend that you seek the Material Safety Datasheet (MSDS) for this chemical from a reliable source and follow its directions.
SIRI
Science Stuff
Fisher Scientific

Structure and properties

Thermodynamic properties

Vapor pressure of liquid

Table data obtained from CRC Handbook of Chemistry and Physics 44th ed.

Distillation data

Spectral data

References

 

Chemical data pages
Chemical data pages cleanup